The Sri Lanka cricket team toured India in November and December 2017. The original schedule had the tour consisting of three Tests, five One Day Internationals (ODIs) and one Twenty20 International (T20I) match starting in February 2018.

In March 2017, Sri Lanka Cricket (SLC) announced the dates for the 2018 Nidahas Trophy, a limited-overs tri-series tournament featuring Sri Lanka, India and Bangladesh. This is scheduled to take place in March 2018. The SLC president Thilanga Sumathipala said that some of the scheduled limited-overs matches fixtures in this series would now be played in the Nidahas Trophy. The revised schedule of the tour now has three Tests, three ODIs and three T20Is. Ahead of the Test series, a two-day tour match was played between the India Board President XI and Sri Lanka.

In August 2017, Board of Control for Cricket in India (BCCI) acting secretary Amitabh Choudhary mentioned that the Tests would be played in Kolkata, Nagpur and Delhi. The ODI venues would be in Dharamshala, Mohali and Visakhapatnam and the three T20 games would be played in Cuttack, Indore and Mumbai. Moreover, Choudhary said that a second reason for Sri Lanka's advanced arrival was the cancellation of the proposed series between India and Pakistan.

In October 2017, Virat Kohli was named as India's captain for the Test series. However, in November 2017, he was rested for the ODIs as well as T20Is in preparation for India's tour to South Africa at the end of the year, with Rohit Sharma named as captain. On 29 November 2017, Thisara Perera was named as Sri Lanka's captain for the ODI and T20I matches, replacing Upul Tharanga.

India won the Test series 1–0, after the first and third matches were drawn. India won the ODI series 2–1, their eighth consecutive series win since beating Zimbabwe in June 2016. India won the T20I series 3–0.

Squads

Hardik Pandya was initially named in India's Test squad, but was later withdrawn from the series to manage his workload. Ahead of the second Test, Bhuvneshwar Kumar and Shikhar Dhawan were released from the team due to personal reasons. Vijay Shankar was named as Bhuvneshwar Kumar’s replacement in the squad. However, ahead of third Test, Dhawan was added back in India's Test squad. Rangana Herath was ruled out of Sri Lanka's squad for the third Test, with Jeffrey Vandersay replacing him.

Ahead of the first ODI, Kedar Jadhav injured his hamstring and was ruled out of the series. He was replaced by Washington Sundar in India's squad.

During the second T20I, Angelo Mathews injured his hamstring and was ruled out of Sri Lanka's squad for the last T20I.

Tour match

Two-day: India Board President XI vs Sri Lanka

Test series

1st Test

2nd Test

3rd Test

Smog
During the second day of the third Test, the Smog in Delhi forced the Sri Lanka cricketers to halt play and wear anti-pollution masks. Cricketer Lahiru Gamage was reported to have breathing shortness. Nic Pothas, coach of the Sri Lankan cricket team, reported that Dhananjaya de Silva and Suranga Lakmal had vomited regularly due to the severe pollution at the ground. There was a haltage of play between 12:32pm to 12:49pm, which caused Indian coach Ravi Shastri to come out to consult with the on-field umpires. BCCI president C. K. Khanna accused the Sri Lankan team of making fuss while Indian spectators called the team "melodramatic". On day 4, India's Mohammed Shami was also seen vomiting on the field.

Following the match, both participating countries criticised the choice to play the Test in Delhi with the high levels of pollution. The Sri Lanka manager Asanka Gurusinha said that both teams were using oxygen cylinders in their dressing rooms due to breathing difficulties, and suggested the use of air-quality meters in future fixtures. President of the Indian Medical Association, KK Agarwal, said that playing in such conditions could result in lung and heart disease, and recommended the inclusion of atmospheric pollution as a factor in the assessment criteria for a match.

ODI series

1st ODI

2nd ODI

3rd ODI

T20I series

1st T20I

2nd T20I

3rd T20I

Notes

References

External links
 Series home at ESPN Cricinfo

2017 in Indian cricket
2017 in Sri Lankan cricket
International cricket competitions in 2017–18
Sri Lankan cricket tours of India